The Bear Lake Comfort Station, also known as the Bear Lake Generator Building, in Rocky Mountain National Park was designed by the National Park Service Branch of Plans and Designs is the National Park Service Rustic style and was built in 1940. It was converted for use as a generator house at an unknown date and apparently no longer serves its former purpose as a public toilet. It was added to the National Register of Historic Places on January 29, 1988.

See also
National Register of Historic Places listings in Larimer County, Colorado

References

Park buildings and structures on the National Register of Historic Places in Colorado
Government buildings completed in 1940
Buildings and structures in Larimer County, Colorado
National Register of Historic Places in Rocky Mountain National Park
National Park Service rustic in Colorado
Restrooms in the United States
National Register of Historic Places in Larimer County, Colorado
1940 establishments in Colorado